Son Without a Home is a 1955 West German drama film directed by Hans Deppe and starring Werner Krauss, Elisabeth Flickenschildt, Josefin Kipper.

It was shot at the Spandau Studios in Berlin and on location at Bad Kissingen in Bavaria. The film's sets were designed by the art director Willi Herrmann.

Cast

See also
 Out of the Mist (1927)

References

Bibliography 
 Hans-Michael Bock and Tim Bergfelder. The Concise Cinegraph: An Encyclopedia of German Cinema. Berghahn Books, 2009.

External links 
 

1955 films
West German films
German drama films
1955 drama films
1950s German-language films
Films directed by Hans Deppe
Films based on German novels
Remakes of German films
Sound film remakes of silent films
Constantin Film films
Films shot at Spandau Studios
1950s German films